Rodrigo Custodio Danao, professionally known as Bimbo Danao (1915 – July 23, 1967) was a Filipino actor.

Profile
He was married to actress Isa Delgado with three daughters and two sons with Japanese actress Keiko Awaji. Danao was LVN's lead actor on the post-war years and he was a famous Filipino crooner. His name extended to Japan where he spent part of his career.

Filmography
 1937 - Nasaan ka, Irog
 1946 - Orasang Ginto [Lvn]
 1946 - Alaala Kita [Lvn]
 1946 - Orasang Ginto [Lvn]
 1947 - Ikaw ay Akin [Lvn]
 1948 - 4 na Dalangin [Luis Nolasco]
 1948 - Krus ng Digma [X'Otic]
 1948 - Siete Dolores [Nolasco Bros.]
 1948 - Mga Busabos ng Palad [Nolasco]
 1949 - Sagur [X'Otic]
 1949 - The 13th Sultan [X'Otic]
 1957 - Turista [Lvn]

References

External links
 
 Lea named Aliw Awards Entertainer of the Year

1915 births
1967 deaths
20th-century Filipino male actors